Lacus Oblivionis (Latin oblīviōnis, "Lake of Forgetfulness") is a small lunar mare on the surface of the Moon. It is located at 21.0° S, 168.0° W and is 50 km in diameter.  The name was adopted by the IAU in 1976.

The crater Mohorovičić R (satellite of Mohorovičić) lies to the northeast, and the crater Sniadecki Y (satellite of Sniadecki) lies to the southwest.

References

Oblivionis